The following is a list of all FM radio stations that are located in Germany ordered by their frequency.

List

References

External links

Germany FM
Radio stations in Germany